Bauer is a band founded in 1999 by former Bettie Serveert drummer Berend Dubbe and based in Amsterdam, Netherlands. To support the debut Bauer album with live shows, Dubbe formed a live band and with member Sonja van Hamel, Bauer was presented as a pop-duo from 2000-2006. Together, they released three records. In 2000, Bauer won a Zilveren Harp (Silver Harp) awarded by Dutch organization BUMA/STEMRA. What began as electropop on earlier albums  developed over time into orchestral pop.

In 2016, after almost 10 years, there is a new Bauer album: Eyes Fully Open. Like 1999's On the Move, it is a solo album (Dubbe). It is the first Bauer album released on Basta Music  (previously the band was signed to Excelsior Recordings Partners in Crime, and Wabana).

Discography

References

External links
Official site of Bauer

Musical groups from Amsterdam
Musical groups established in 1999
Dutch alternative rock groups
1999 establishments in the Netherlands